L DK, stylized as L♥DK, is a shōjo manga by Ayu Watanabe, serialized in the Japanese manga magazine Bessatsu Friend since 2009; it has been adapted into a live-action film that was released in 2014.

The story tells about the relationship between a high school girl, Aoi Nishimori, and the school prince, Shūsei Kugayama, when they come to share a small apartment. The series volumes have appeared on the Oricon comic charts a few times, and adapted into a Drama CD with the eighth volume of the manga.

Premise 
Shūsei Kugayama, the "Prince" of his high school, has a reputation of turning down confessions from admiring girls; Aoi Nishimori takes offense after he turns down her best friend, Moe Shibuya. Later that day, Aoi is greeted by her new apartment neighbor which turns out to be Shūsei. After a kitchen fire accident ruins Shūsei's apartment,  Shūsei decides to move into Aoi's flat, but becomes more casual and friendly towards her at school. After getting to know him better, Aoi falls in love with him, although he does not initially return that feeling. Meanwhile, they must keep their cohabitation a secret. Aoi tries to divert the girls who are interested in Shūsei, the boys who are interested in her, and family members who reveal hints about Shūsei's past. The two eventually come to fall in love with one another.

Characters

Main characters

Aoi is a 16-year-old high school girl who lives in her own apartment after refusing to move away with her parents. She is described as impulsive, but is inexperienced with love. She has no reservations in confronting the school prince Shūsei Kugayama over her best friend Moe's confession rejection, but is surprised when Shūsei becomes her new next-door neighbor. She is a capable cook, however, because of Shūsei's presence, she becomes careless and a fire erupts in his kitchen. After Shūsei moves in with her, Aoi is shocked that he is so casual and friendly towards her at home and at school, but soon develops feelings for him, and becomes sensitive to other girls who express interest in him.  In the live-action films, she is portrayed by Ayame Goriki, and by Mone Kamishiraishi in the sequel.

Shusei is regarded highly as the school prince, even though he has a habit of rudely turning down the girls' confessions. He becomes Aoi's next-door neighbor in the apartments, but after a kitchen fire causes the sprinklers to drench his place, he moves into Aoi's apartment. He likes to tease Aoi by acting very casual at home, by visiting her class, by making randomly inappropriate remarks about Aoi's undergarments and by pulling practical jokes. Despite that, he is protective of Aoi. His past relationship with Satsuki Mizuno has affected how he behaves towards women, but he warms up to Aoi and eventually reciprocates her love. Media articles from Animate.tv and Animeanime.jp describe him as being tsundere. In the live-action films, Shūsei is portrayed by Kento Yamazaki, and by Yosuke Sugino in the sequel.

Supporting characters 

Moe is Aoi's best friend. A week prior to the start of the story, she confesses to Shūsei but is turned down. She easily reads that Aoi has fallen in love with Shūsei, even though Aoi has denied it.  Moe is portrayed by Rei Okamoto in the first film and Sara Takatsuki in the sequel.

The 
The landlady of Aoi and Shūsei's apartment is a widowed mother with her son Kouta. She takes a liking to Wataru Sanjo. She is later revealed to be a former delinquent and had ridden a Harley with her husband. Her name is not given in the manga, but in the live-action film she is named  and she is portrayed by Miho Shiraishi.,

Eri is Shūsei's older sister; she is suspicious of Shūsei and Aoi's living situation as they have not acted like a couple and insists that Shūsei stay with her, but later lets them be.

Shōta is a class-year younger than Aoi and Shūsei. Aoi describes him as a pretty boy. He shows an interest in Aoi after having a friendly encounter with her in the cultural festival the previous year, and tries to woo her after seeing her again, which makes Aoi uncomfortable and Shūsei jealous. He and Shūsei were on the basketball team together in middle school.

Sōju is Shūsei's older brother who works as a photojournalist. He talks to Aoi about her relationship with Shūsei and gives her some advice. After Aoi fails to kiss Shūsei, Sōju demonstrates with his own kiss on her, and then gets Aoi to act affectionate with him in order to make Shūsei jealous when he visits. He is engaged to Satsuki, but their marriage registration is later called off. Sōju is portrayed by Seiji Fukushi and Keita Machida.

Satsuki is Shūsei's childhood friend in middle school and was part of the basketball club. She dated Shūsei, but they broke up. She appears in the story as the fiancée to Shūsei's older brother, Sōju. After the marriage registration is called off, she gets her own apartment and tries to cling onto Shūsei. She is portrayed by Anna Ishibashi in the live-action film.

Wataru enters the story as a new tenant in the apartments. He is a senior student at Aoi's school. Both he and Aoi enjoy cooking. He likes Aoi because of her smile at the sports festival last year. After Aoi gets upset that Shūsei revealed the cohabitation secret to him so casually, he comforts Aoi, and promises to keep it secret unless Shūsei makes her unhappy. After Shusei leaves, he confesses to Aoi and offers to support her emotionally. After realizing that Aoi is always going to put Shūsei first in her heart, he lets go. He has three older sisters and his parents are overseas in China. In the live-action film, he works at a nearby food accessories store. He is portrayed by Renn Kiriyama.

Ryōsuke is Shūsei's close friend, a high school senior and a character exclusive to the live-action film.  He ends up dating Moe. He is portrayed by Akiyoshi Nakao and Kazuki Horike. In an interview, Nakao said that he promises to do his best to play the character without any awkwardness.

Aoi's father visits and learns of Aoi and Shusei's cohabitation. He tries to pull Aoi out of school.  He is a former bodybuilder that Aoi calls a "muscle narcissist".  When Aoi gets into trouble at the park, he tries to save her but has gotten too old to handle the delinquents. After Aoi is rescued by Shūsei and she declares her desire to protect Shūsei as he protected her, he agrees to let them live together under the condition they stay together but not have sex.

Media

Manga 
The manga is written by manga artist Ayu Watanabe. The chapters have been appearing monthly in Kodansha's shojo manga magazine, Bessatsu Friend, since 2009. A drama CD was bundled with the release of volume 8 of the manga. The series concluded in the September 2017 issue. A two-chapter bonus manga was released in the magazine's October–November 2017 issue. The manga series was packaged into 24 volumes.

A sequel manga titled LDK Pink will begin serialization in Bessatsu Friend on February 12, 2022.

Volume list

Films 
A live-action film adaptation was announced on May 9, 2013 and was released on April 12, 2014. The film starred Ayame Goriki as Aoi and Kento Yamazaki as Shusei. This is Goriki's first solo lead role in a romance film. The film was directed by Yasuhiro Kawamura and written by Yuuko Matsuda. Filming took place in July 2013 and at the Cosmo World amusement park in Kanagawa. Goriki, who has had short hair for the past three years, wore a wig when she played Aoi.

A film adaptation sequel was released on March 21, 2019 under the title . The film stars Mone Kamishiraishi as Aoi, Yosuke Sugino as Shusei, and Ryusei Yokohama as Shusei's cousin Reo, an original character.

Reception
Rebecca Silverman from Anime News Network gave the first volume an overall B grade, citing its strengths in using standard romance tropes without using the "less charming" aspects.

LDK has sold over 2.7 million copies in its first 12 volumes, and was listed as a top seller for January 2013 e-book downloads for NTT DoCoMo.

LDK ranked first in the Shojo Manga category for the 2013 E-Book Award in the magazine Da Vinci. It was nominated for the 38th Kodansha Manga Award for Best Shojo Manga.

For its opening weekend, the L DK live-action film ranked fourth in gross (second among Japanese-produced films). The film grossed US$3,758,081 in Japan.

Legacy
L DK was known for popularizing the kabedon move where Shūsei pins Aoi to a wall using his arm

Notes

Works cited
  "Ch." is shortened form for chapter and refers to a chapter number of the L DK manga

References

External links 
  at Kodansha
  2nd live-action movie official website
 
 
 

Drama anime and manga
Kodansha manga
Live-action films based on manga
Manga adapted into films
Romance anime and manga
Shōjo manga
Slice of life anime and manga
Japanese romantic drama films